The Accentor-class minesweeper, sometimes called the Accentor/Acme-class minesweeper, was a small minesweeper used by the United States Navy during World War II. The Accentor-class minesweeper was designed for the sweeping of mines in harbors, bays, and other littoral waters.

Design 
Typically, the Accentor-class minesweepers were armed with a pair of .50 caliber machine guns for protection. Rather than creating new minesweeping vessels, forty-five wooden-hulled fishing boats were converted into Accentor-class minesweepers. Since these converted fishing boats were not all the same, their specifications varied slightly.

Service history 
In World War II, the Accentor-class minesweepers were used to sweep mines in harbors, bays, and other littoral waters, due to their small size. The minesweepers were used to remove mines placed defensively in harbors and coastal waters by the United States Navy.

After the war 
After World War II ended and most postwar minesweeping tasks had been completed, the Accentor-class minesweepers were declared surplus to naval needs. By the end of 1946, all 70 of the Accentor class were decommissioned. They were transferred to the United States Maritime Commission (MARCOM) for disposal. The two .50 caliber machine guns and minesweeping equipment were removed by MARCOM, after which the vessels were sold to various American marine towing companies and fisheries to be used as civilian vessels.

Ships of the Accentor class 

(AMc-56 through AMc-60 are not a part of the Accentor-class)

See also
APc-1-class small coastal transports a modified Accentor-class minesweeper ship
Wooden boats of World War 2

References

External links
 Ships of the U.S. Navy, 1940–1945 Minecraft

 

 
Mine warfare vessel classes
World War II minesweepers of the United States